Muhammed Jah is a Gambian entrepreneur and businessman who is best known for being founder and CEO of QuantumNet Group, one of the larger technology corporations in Gambia. As of June 2012, the corporation was worth around US$156 million. He has been named "Gambian Businessman of the Year" 3 times.

Early life and education 
Jah studied Islamic studies in Saudi Arabia. After encountering the computer industry in the early 90s, he studied Electronics and Communications at the University of Sierra Leone.

Business 
He founded QuantemNet Group, as a computer training center on a $16,000 loan from an uncle to buy computers and other equipment. The center was renamed the QuantumNet Institute of Technology  in 2006. The firm grew to sell equipment and as a distributor to international technology companies.

He grew the business investing in QCell the first 3g company in The Gambia.

Personal life 
Jah was stranded with his wife, Neneh Secka, and three kids in the United States due to the COVID-19 Pandemic.

Jah's brother is Doctor Abubacarr Jah.

References 

Gambian businesspeople
Year of birth missing (living people)
Living people